The South African Railways Class GMA 4-8-2+2-8-4 of 1954 is an articulated steam locomotive.

Between 1954 and 1958, the South African Railways placed 120 Class GMA Garratt articulated steam locomotives with a 4-8-2+2-8-4 Double Mountain type wheel arrangement in service. All the locomotives could be configured as either a Class GMA branch line or a Class GMAM mainline engine. This was the most numerous Garratt class in the world.

Manufacturers
The light rail branch line Class GMA and mainline Class GMAM Garratt locomotive, a single Class which could be configured for either branch line or mainline working, was a development of the large Class GM branch line locomotive which was introduced on the South African Railways (SAR) in 1938. Like the Class GM, the Class GMA was a tank-and-tender Garratt which ran with a semi-permanently coupled auxiliary water tender to augment its meagre water capacity.

The locomotive was designed in 1952 under the supervision of L.C. Grubb, Chief Mechanical Engineer (CME) of the SAR from 1949 to 1954. An order for the first 25 of these locomotives was placed with Henschel and Son in Germany. They were built in 1953 and were delivered and placed in service in 1954, numbered in the range from 4051 to 4075. These first 25 locomotives were equipped with Type X-17 water tenders, built by the SAR in its Pietermaritzburg shops in 1953.

A second batch of 35 locomotives was delivered by Beyer, Peacock and Company (BP) in 1956. Of these, 23 were built by BP and numbered in the range from 4076 to 4098, while the other twelve, numbered in the range from 4099 to 4110, had been subcontracted by BP to the North British Locomotive Company (NBL). These twelve engines therefore bore works plates showing BP as well as NBL as builders.

This was followed by a third and final batch of sixty locomotives in 1958. Of these, thirty were delivered by BP, of which only ten, numbered in the range from 4121 to 4130, had actually been built by BP. The other twenty, numbered in the ranges from 4111 to 4120 and 4131 to 4140, had once again been subcontracted by BP to NBL. These twenty therefore also bore works plates showing BP as well as NBL as builders. Number 4140 turned out to be the last steam locomotive built by North British. The other thirty locomotives of the third batch, numbered in the range from 4141 to 4170, were again built by Henschel in Germany.

The locomotives of the second and third batches were equipped with Type X-20 water tenders, built in the Pietermaritzburg shops between 1956 and 1958.

Characteristics
The light rail branch line Class GMA and the mainline Class GMAM were the same locomotive of which the water and coal capacities could be adjusted to suit by installing or removing plates in the coal and water spaces. As a result, it is virtually impossible to list the GMA and GMAM versions separately since they could easily be converted back and forth between the two versions and often were. Up until about 1962, for example, the division was 20 Class GMA and 100 Class GMAM, but by 1969 there were 69 Class GMA and 39 Class GMAM, two locomotives having by then been scrapped after accident damage. By 1975, on the other hand, there were only 25 Class GMA against 93 Class GMAM.

The locomotive was thoroughly modern in design, with a one-piece cast steel frame with Franklin spring-loaded wedge horns, manufactured by Commonwealth Steel Castings Corporation in the United States of America. Like the Class 25 locomotive, it had roller bearing axle boxes on all wheels, but not on the crank-pins, with cannon boxes on all axles, except those of the inner Bissel trucks which had outside bearings. It had mechanical lubrication throughout, self-adjusting pivots, a U-shaped foundation ring welded to the inner and outer firebox bottom edges, and an all-welded firebox. The engine units also had Commonwealth cast steel type frames.

The boiler had an inspection manhole, fitted to the top of the boiler aft of the dome. The locomotive was superheated, with a mechanical stoker and Walschaerts valve gear.

Some of these locomotives, intended for working in areas where there were tunnels such as on the East London mainline, were initially equipped with steam-operated smoke deflecting cowls over their chimneys. When the smoke cowls were later removed, these specific locomotives could still be identified by their almost non-existent chimneys which had to be shorter in order to enable the cowls to fit within the loading gauge.

As with the Class GM, the Class GMA's water supply was augmented by semi-permanently coupling a purpose-built auxiliary water tender. The tenders were numbered for their engines and were painted black with red buffer beams.

Although the SAR specifications called for a  maximum axle loading, the Class GMAM spent its entire career running on track that could take  or more. Their shortcomings as traffic machines was possibly one of the root causes of the rapid mainline dieselisation of the SAR in the 1960s.

Service

South African Railways
The 120 locomotives of this class made it the most numerous Garratt class in the world. The Class GMA and Class GMAM saw service on main- and secondary lines in many parts of South Africa. Prior to electrification, a number were employed in Transvaal on the Komatipoort line across the pass between Waterval Onder and Waterval Boven. Along with the Class GM, the Class GMA served on the line from Krugersdorp via Zeerust to Mafeking.

They also served temporarily on the coal line from Witbank to Germiston until the electrification between Witbank and Welgedag was completed. The second and third batches of locomotives were ordered from 1956 to assist with moving large volumes of traffic, mostly coal, from the Transvaal to destinations in the Free State and Cape Province. Since the track en route was built for  axle loads, such a large order for locomotives with a  axle loading was unusual.

In Natal, the bulk of the Class was based at Pietermaritzburg, from where they worked most trains on the two heavily graded branch lines to Greytown and Franklin. Others worked on the Natal North Coast line between Stanger and Empangeni, while some joined the Class GL on the coal line between Vryheid and Glencoe.

The Cape Western system's locomotives were stationed at Worcester, from where they worked the old New Cape Central Railway (NCCR) line via Riversdale to Mosselbaai until it was dieselised. Between 1981 and 1984, a number were allocated to the Cape Northern system to work the line from Vryburg to Mafeking, where they largely replaced the Class 19D locomotives which had earlier dominated on this line. This turned out to be their last term in mainline service since they were replaced by Class 25NC locomotives in 1984 when the line was relaid with heavier rail.

Most of the Class was then allocated to the Cape Midland System in 1984, with most of them initially stationed at Voorbaai where they replaced the Class GEA on trains from Mosselbaai to Riversdale and across the Montagu Pass to Oudtshoorn. Their allocation was later extended to the sheds at Sydenham in Port Elizabeth, Rosmead, Klipplaat and Graaff-Reinet, with the result that they worked most of the trains over the route from Port Elizabeth to Rosmead via Klipplaat and across the Lootsberg Pass from Graaff-Reinet.

Towards the end of their service lives, the Eastern Transvaal system still had an allocation of them, where locomotives from the Waterval Boven and Breyten sheds worked the line down to Vryheid in Natal.

They were the last class of Garratt to remain in service with the SAR. All but three were withdrawn from service by April 1988 and those three were also retired shortly afterwards.

4140 (BP 7855, NBL 27792) was the last of the class delivered and became the last steam locomotive built by the North British Locomotive Company.

Zimbabwe and Mozambique

During the period from August 1979 to September 1981, altogether 26 locomotives of the Class were hired to Zimbabwe-Rhodesia, but not all at the same time since they were rotated with Capital Park in Pretoria as their nominal home for the occasions when they had to return to South Africa for major repairs. On the Rhodesia Railways (RR), later the National Railways of Zimbabwe, they worked from Bulawayo to Gwelo and to Wankie and beyond to Victoria Falls.

Six of these locomotives were loaned by RR to the Caminhos de Ferro de Moçambique (CFM) for a short while to work the CFM Centro line from Beira to Umtali in Zimbabwe.

In Zimbabwe-Rhodesia, these locomotives normally worked chimney first with the water tank at the rear. Since the Rhodesian bush war was still ongoing in 1979, the locomotives were equipped with armour plating around the cab. Since this obscured the number plates, the engine numbers were then usually stencilled on the cabsides. The Class GMAM was similar in size with a similar coal capacity to the Rhodesia Railways 20th class 4-8-2+2-8-4 Garratt, but it had a voracious appetite for coal and frequently ran low on fuel with the result that trains often had to be dumped. In an attempt to solve this problem, RR extended the height of the Class GMAM's coal bunker by a foot to increase the capacity.

26 GMAM Garratts were hired to Rhodesia/Zimbabwe between August 1979 to December 1981

+ 4059 Hired to Rhodesia/Zimbabwe 12/1979 to 07/1981

+ 4060 Hired to Rhodesia/Zimbabwe 08/1979 to 09/1981

+ 4064 Hired to Rhodesia/Zimbabwe 08/1979 to 05/1981

+ 4065 Hired to Rhodesia/Zimbabwe 08/1979 to 03/1981

+ 4070 Hired to Rhodesia/Zimbabwe 08/1980 to 02/1981

+ 4071 Hired to Rhodesia/Zimbabwe 12/1979 to 09/1980

+ 4087 Hired to Rhodesia/Zimbabwe 08/1979 to 09/1981

+ 4089 Hired to Rhodesia/Zimbabwe 08/1979 to 10/1981

+ 4090 Hired to Rhodesia/Zimbabwe 12/1979 to 09/1980

+ 4098 Hired to Rhodesia/Zimbabwe 01/1980 to 09/1981

+ 4099 Hired to Rhodesia/Zimbabwe 12/1979 to 03/1981

+ 4102 Hired to Rhodesia/Zimbabwe 09/1980 to 05/1981

+ 4103 Hired to Rhodesia/Zimbabwe 12/1979 to 02/1981

+ 4111 Hired to Rhodesia/Zimbabwe 02/1980 to 02/1981

+ 4112 Hired to Rhodesia/Zimbabwe 08/1979 to 10/1980

+ 4117 Hired to Rhodesia/Zimbabwe 06/1980 to 02/1981

+ 4120 Hired to Rhodesia/Zimbabwe 08/1979 to 10/1980

+ 4121 Hired to Rhodesia/Zimbabwe 12/1979 to 09/1981

+ 4125 Hired to Rhodesia/Zimbabwe 08/1979 to 04/1980

+ 4126 Hired to Rhodesia/Zimbabwe 12/1979 to 01/1980

+ 4129 Hired to Rhodesia/Zimbabwe 03/1979 to 10/1980

+ 4134 Hired to Rhodesia/Zimbabwe 08/1979 to 10/1980

+ 4135 Hired to Rhodesia/Zimbabwe 08/1979 to 02/1981

+ 4137 Hired to Rhodesia/Zimbabwe 08/1979 to 09/1980

+ 4139 Hired to Rhodesia/Zimbabwe 08/1979 to 08/1981

+ 4140 Hired to Rhodesia/Zimbabwe 12/1979 to 08/1981

Industrial, private ownership and preservation

Several locomotives of the class were sold into industrial service and some later were saved for preservation after being sold on into private ownership. The majority went to the Randfontein Estates Gold Mining Company (REGM). Two were sold to the Hotham Valley Railway in Western Australia where they were to haul tourists in ex SAR passenger coaches. These two locomotives, 4090 and 4129 however, never left South Africa and after standing at Bloemfontein loco for 20 years, they were scrapped in May 2016. 4074 was rebuilt after REGM service with the boiler cradle off 4126 and therefore is shown listed as such per the Beyer Peacock numbering and locomotive identification protocol.
 No. 4059 became REGM's no. R16 first named Sarah then later Wendy, now scrapped
 No. 4060 became REGM's first no. R15 May, now scrapped.
 No. 4073 became REGM's no. R17 Doria, now scrapped.
 No. 4079 became REGM's second no. R15 May later renumbered R1. Restored as Lindie Lou by Sandstone Estates. Today it is stored out of service at Reefsteamers, Germiston for Sandstone Estates.
 No. 4083 became REGM R3. In 1997 after rebuild at Dunn's it went to New Zealand for preservation with Mainline Steam using the power units off 4088 and was steamed there twice. However, the front power unit was found to be bent upon testing in New Zealand and a replacement power unit off the dismantled 4126 was shipped from Dunn's. Today is fitted with the front engine unit of no. 4126 and the rear of no. 4088.
 No. 4084 became REGM's no R9 then after 7/83 R10, Scrapped after a collision 4/85.
 No. 4088 became REGM R2. Sold to the Sandstone Estates but not delivered, it was scrapped on site at REGM after the power units were removed for 4083
 No. 4090 was to go to the Hotham Valley Railway in Western Australia. Scrapped at Bloemfontein Loco, May 2016.
 No. 4107 became REGM's first no. R14 Cherrie, now scrapped.
 No. 4108 went to Tweefontein Colliery, now scrapped.
 No. 4110 became REGM's no. R6, now scrapped.
 No. 4112 first went to England still in operating condition for preservation. It was later moved to the Summerlee Heritage Park in Coatbridge, Scotland. It has recently received a cosmetic overhaul.
 No. 4114 became REGM's no. R5. Now on display at the Sandstone Estate.
 No. 4119 became REGM's second no. R14 Cherrie, now scrapped.
 No. 4123 became REGM's no. R11 Vivienne, now scrapped.
 No. 4125 was sold to Dunns, first hired to Durnacol and later to Tweefontein Colliery as their no. 2 Margret, now scrapped.
 No. 4126 went to Tweefontein Colliery. Parts including the boiler cradle were later sold to the Umgeni Steam Railway. In April 2010 it was donated to the Creighton municipality who paid for the overhaul when the Umgeni Steam Railway who had gone bankrupt could not afford the cost. Had this not happened, it would have certainly been scrapped. Today (January 2021), it is the only GMA/M operable. It runs as 4074 whose power units it uses.
 No. 4128 became REGM's no. R9 Kathy. Later returned to Transnet for excursion service, stored at Voorbaai since 2005.
 No. 4129 was to go to the Hothan Valley Railway in Western Australia. Scrapped at Bloemfontein Loco, May 2016.
 No. 4130 became REGM's no. R8, now scrapped.
 No. 4133 became REGM's second no. R10, now scrapped.
 No. 4135 became REGM's third no. R14 Joan later renumbered R4 and named Barbara.
 No. 4136 became REGM's no. R12 Barbara. Later returned to Transnet. It is stored today at Bloemfontein where it is cared for by Mainline Steam, New Zealand.
 No. 4168 was sold to Dunns, first hired to Durnacol and later to Tweefontein Colliery as their no. 1, now scrapped.

Preservation

Works numbers
The builders, works numbers and years built of these locomotives are listed in the table.

Illustration

References

External links

2490
2490
4-8-2+2-8-4 locomotives
2D1+1D2 locomotives
Henschel locomotives
Beyer, Peacock locomotives
NBL locomotives
Garratt locomotives
Cape gauge railway locomotives
Railway locomotives introduced in 1954
1954 in South Africa